Democratic and Popular Rally (RDP) is a Sankarist political party in Burkina Faso. 
It is led by Nana Thibaut.

Political parties in Burkina Faso
Sankarist political parties in Burkina Faso